Red Lake Airport  is located  north of Red Lake, Ontario, Canada.

The airport serves as a point of call for air carriers offering scheduled passenger service, and an operating base for Ontario Ministry of Natural Resources. It services both private and commercial fixed-wing aircraft and helicopter operators located on site.

History
Commercial air service to the area began in 1926 using the waters of Howey Bay on Red Lake as a float and sea plane base. Due to the freight requirements of the gold mines developing in the area, Howey Bay was recognized as the busiest airport in the world during 1936 and 1937.

Construction of a  gravel runway began in 1946 and was put into use of May 29, 1947 when Canadian Pacific Air Lines began daily service from Winnipeg.

The airport operated privately until 1959 when the Department of Transport took over and lighting was installed. In 1996, the Township of Golden became the owner/operator of the Red Lake Airport. In 1998, the Township of Golden and Red Lake along with the Local Services Board of Madsen amalgamated to form the Municipality of Red Lake.

In October 2011, a new airport terminal opened, replacing a small terminal building from the 1980s. On June 22, 2012, the airport terminal was officially named J.E.J. Fahlgren Terminal after a local mine manager and community leader.

Those leaving or arriving in Red Lake now enter a building that has a large ticket and rental car counters, luggage carousels, naturally lit seating areas, Nav Canada offices and space for administration. A modern parking lot has been implemented and a rental space is available for franchises inside the airport terminal building.

Airlines and destinations

See also
 Red Lake Water Aerodrome

References

External links

Certified airports in Kenora District
Red Lake, Ontario